The Uwharrie River is a  long river, in the Piedmont region of central North Carolina in the United States. It is a tributary of the Pee Dee River, which flows to the Atlantic Ocean.

Course 
The Uwharrie River rises in northwestern Randolph County, just south of the city of High Point, and flows generally southwardly into northwestern Montgomery County, through the low Uwharrie Mountains and the Uwharrie National Forest. It flows into the Pee Dee River 8 mi (13 km) east of the city of Albemarle as part of the Lake Tillery reservoir, across the Pee Dee from Morrow Mountain State Park. Above the mouth of the Uwharrie, the Pee Dee is known as the Yadkin River.

In its upper course, the Uwharrie collects a minor tributary named the Little Uwharrie River, which flows for a short distance through northwestern Randolph County.

Variant names 
The United States Board on Geographic Names settled on Uharie River as the river's name in 1895, and changed it to "Uwharrie River" in 1940. According to the Geographic Names Information System, the Uwharrie River has also been known as:

See also 
 List of North Carolina rivers

References 

 Columbia Gazetteer of North America entry
 DeLorme (2001). North Carolina Atlas & Gazetteer. Yarmouth, Maine: DeLorme. .

External links 
 Pictures of the Uwharrie River

Rivers of North Carolina
Rivers of Montgomery County, North Carolina
Rivers of Randolph County, North Carolina
Tributaries of the Pee Dee River